The Journal of the History of Childhood and Youth is an international peer-reviewed academic journal dealing with the development of childhood and youth cultures and the experience of young people in different times and places.

The journal is open to a wide range of historical methodologies as well as other disciplines with a historical focus. As well as original research articles, it includes essays discussing contemporary issues of childhood and youth in a historical context. Each issue also includes an "object lesson" on an object from the material culture of childhood, contemporary policy pieces, and book reviews. JHCY is the official journal of the Society for the History of Children and Youth. It is indexed in Historical Abstracts and America: History and Life, the two principal historical indexing services.

The journal was founded in 2008 and is published three times per year by the Johns Hopkins University Press.

See also 
 Childhood studies
 Youth

External links 
 Official website
 Journal of the History of Childhood and Youth  at Project MUSE
 The Society for the History of Children and Youth

History journals
Cultural journals
Publications established in 2008
Triannual journals
English-language journals
Johns Hopkins University Press academic journals
Demography journals